Poșta Moldovei is the company responsible for postal service in Moldova.

The company was founded on April 1, 1993, as a result of the division of the postal communications sector from that of telecommunications. Since June 2005, the Poșta Moldovei is under the direction of the Ministry of Information Technologies and Communications.

The first issue of postage stamps in the country was launched on June 23, 1991 through the series "The first anniversary of the proclamation of the sovereignty of the Republic of Moldova".

Since January 2007, Poșta Moldovei is a member of the Telematics Cooperative.

See also 
 Postage stamps and postal history of Moldova

Bibliography  
 Dinu Poștarenco. Poșta Moldovei. File de istorie. Chişinău 2000. Editura Civitas.

External links 
 
 
 MoldovaStamps.org - Catalogue of the Postage Stamps of Moldova

Communications in Moldova
Companies of Moldova
Moldova